Rao Gopal Dev (1829–1862) was a nineteenth-century revolutionary leader in Rewari, Ahirwal, who allied himself with his cousin, Rao Tula Ram, during the Indian Rebellion of 1857. He was sixth generation descendant of famous Rao Shahbaz Singh and first cousin of Rao Tula Ram. He inherited personal jagir of 841 villages after the death of his father Rao Nathu Ram in 1855.

See also
Rao Mitra Sen Ahir
Rao Ruda Singh

References

 Dr. Ravindra Singh Yadav & Vijaypal, 1857 ki kranti k purodha: Rao Raja Tularam, Punit Publication, Jaipur, 2013 
 Anil Yadav, Krantidoot--Rao Raja Tularam, Sarita Book House, 1999, Delhi.

External links
 
 

Indian revolutionaries
People from Rewari
1829 births
1862 deaths